

Men's tournament
The 2005 Men's Basketball Cup was contested by eight teams and won by Primeiro de Agosto. The final was played on May 6, 2005.

Women's tournament
The 2005 Women's Basketball Cup was won by Primeiro de Agosto A.

Preliminary round

Final round

See also
 2005 Angola Basketball Super Cup
 2005 BAI Basket

References

Angola Basketball Cup seasons
Cup